Robert Lee Baird (November 17, 1920 - December 16, 2005) was an American jockey and trainer in Thoroughbred horse racing and a decorated soldier who served with General Patton’s Third Army in World War II with which he landed on Utah Beach on D Day.

Robert Lee Baird was often referred to as "Bobby" and usually recorded in racing sheets as R. L. Baird. His career began in 1937 but would be interrupted for three and a half years of wartime military service during which he was awarded four Purple Hearts. It ended with his retirement in 1982 with 3,749 career wins. For the final three years in racing, Baird worked as a trainer and then as an agent for his son, jockey Edward Thomas Baird who was often recorded as E. T. Baird.

Baird rode in the Kentucky Derby five times, the last coming in 1978 which made the then fifty-seven-year-old the oldest jockey ever to compete in the first leg of the U. S. Triple Crown series. Also in that race was sixteen-year-old Steve Cauthen, the youngest jockey to ever ride in the Kentucky Derby who became its youngest winner aboard Affirmed.

In 1975 Baird was inducted into the Fair Grounds Racing Hall of Fame.

References

1920 births
2005 deaths
United States Army personnel of World War II
American jockeys
American horse trainers
People from Texas